Leeds South by-election  may refer to:
1892 Leeds South by-election
1908 Leeds South by-election
1963 Leeds South by-election

See also 
Leeds South (UK Parliament constituency)